Zac Brown Band is an  American country music band based in Atlanta, Georgia. The lineup consists of Zac Brown (lead vocals, guitar), Jimmy De Martini (fiddle, vocals), John Driskell Hopkins (bass guitar, guitar, baritone guitar, banjo, ukulele, upright bass, vocals), Coy Bowles (guitar, keyboards), Chris Fryar (drums), Clay Cook (guitar, keyboards, mandolin, steel guitar, vocals), Matt Mangano (bass guitar), Daniel de los Reyes (percussion), and Caroline Jones (guitar, keyboards, harmonica, vocals).

The band has released seven studio albums along with two live albums, one greatest-hits album, and two extended plays. They have also 16 singles on the Billboard Hot Country Songs or Country Airplay chart, of which 13 have reached number 1. Their first album, The Foundation, is certified triple-platinum by the Recording Industry Association of America, while its follow-ups, You Get What You Give and Uncaged, are certified platinum. Artists with whom they have collaborated include Alan Jackson, Jimmy Buffett, Kid Rock, Jason Mraz, Dave Grohl, Chris Cornell, Brandi Carlile, Avicii, and Los Lonely Boys

History

Formation

In 2002, Brown was traveling with a heavy tour schedule of approximately 200 dates a year. The initial Zac Brown Band lineup consisted of Brown, on acoustic guitar and lead vocals, backed by drummer Marcus Petruska and bass guitarist Jacob Lawson. In 2003, Brown started his own label, called Home Grown—it was later renamed "Southern Ground".

In 2004, Brown opened a music club and restaurant with his father in the Lake Oconee area of Georgia, called "Zac's Place" where the fare was southern-style cooking. A developer bought the restaurant and, in turn, the Zac Brown Band bought a tour bus and began touring full-time, playing rock and country clubs, as well as folk and jam band festivals. The release of the Zac Brown Band's first independent album, Home Grown, occurred during the same year.

Also in 2004, Brown added violinist/fiddler and tenor vocalist Jimmy De Martini to the lineup. According to an interview with De Martini, he explained that Wyatt Durrette, Brown's frequent songwriting collaborator, was working as a bartender at Sidelines Sports Bar in Kennesaw, Georgia, at the time, where the Zac Brown Band frequently performed. Durette suggested De Martini to Brown, who was wanting a "lead instrument" in his band, as well as a harmony singer. After doing several performances with the band at the club, Brown asked De Martini to become a permanent member, to which De Martini gladly obliged.

Brown met John Driskell Hopkins in 1998 when Hopkins was hosting an open mic night at CJ's Landing in Buckhead, Georgia. Hopkins later recorded Home Grown in his music studio, Brighter Shade Studios. The two remained friends, and in 2005, Hopkins stepped in as bass guitarist while helping the group finish what became their number-one single "Toes". "Toes" was the second single from the band's major-label debut, The Foundation, which was partially recorded in Hopkins' studio. You Get What You Give was also partially recorded in Brighter Shade Studios.

Coy Bowles transferred to Atlanta's Georgia State University to study music. He subsequently became involved in Atlanta's various music scenes, and eventually formed Coy Bowles and the Fellowship in 2004. Two years later, Bowles decided to reconnect with Brown. Through mutual friends, he learned that the Zac Brown Band was scheduled to perform in Atlanta one evening. Bowles and Brown spent the afternoon prior to the performance reacquainting with each other, which ended with Brown inviting Bowles to sit in with his band at that night's performance. To return the favor, Bowles invited the band to attend his own gig with the Fellowship a couple of months later, which in turn resulted in Brown and his band sitting in at that gig.

This turn of events continued for eight months until Bowles concluded that it was too overwhelming to balance his time with Brown's band and his own band, in addition to other activities; he therefore made a decision to put the Fellowship on an indefinite hiatus, and became a permanent member of the Zac Brown Band.

In 2008, the Zac Brown Band signed to Live Nation Artists Records, in association with Brown's own Home Grown label, after Chris Fryar became an addition to the band. An Alabama native, Fryar attended the University of North Texas and the Mississippi University for Women, and made a name for himself in the Birmingham music scene. According to Fryar, a mutual friend recommended him to Brown, who was in need of a new drummer for the band. Fryar, who in turn had just finished a stint with a previous band, subsequently auditioned and shortly afterward became the Zac Brown Band's newest member.

In 2014, with the addition of bass guitarist Matt Mangano to the line-up, Hopkins expanded from his own role as bass guitarist to add other instruments in his arsenal such as standard six-string guitar, seven-string guitar, baritone guitar, ukulele, double bass, and banjo.

Commercial success

The Zac Brown Band's debut single, "Chicken Fried", was originally recorded in 2003 and included on the Home Grown album, but later re-recorded and released to country radio in 2008. This song was also recorded by The Lost Trailers, whose 2006 recording was released as a single but withdrawn after Brown decided that he wanted to release it himself. Brown also co-wrote "Simple Life", a song recorded by The Lost Trailers on their 2006 self-titled album.

In the third episode of HBO's music documentary series Sonic Highways, Brown was a featured interviewee and explained why Lost Trailer's version of "Chicken Fried" was pulled from the radio. Brown stated that after six years of touring that he was broke and sleeping in his tour van. In 2005 the Lost Trailers contacted Brown and expressed interest in recording "Chicken Fried". Brown stated he agreed under the condition that the song would only be an album cut and not a single as he still had hopes of releasing the song as a radio single himself.

Both parties agreed and the Lost Trailers recorded the song. Some months later the Lost Trailers landed a deal with Sony Nashville, and when they submitted the tracks for their album, they included "Chicken Fried". Joe Galante, then the Chairman of Sony Music Nashville, heard the tracks and chose "Chicken Fried" as the single that the label wanted to promote.

Brown described hearing his song on the radio: "The first time I hear 'Chicken Fried' on the radio and it wasn't us singing it. It was a nightmare." Brown then called his lawyer to have the song pulled from the radio immediately. Brown's lawyer warned him that because of Galante's power in the Nashville music scene that pulling the song could essentially have him blackballed in Nashville. Brown was insistent that his agreement with the Lost Trailers was violated, so his lawyer issued a cease and desist letter and the single was pulled from the radio.

A few months later The Zac Brown Band was booked to perform at 3rd and Lindsley in Nashville and producer Keith Stegall came to watch their performance. Stegall and Brown had drinks later that night and Brown recalled Stegall stating, "I just had to meet the kid that told Joe Galante to fuck off!" Brown credits this incident and his meeting and collaboration with Stegall as the beginning of his success in the music business.

In October 2008, Atlantic Records acquired distribution of "Chicken Fried" after Live Nation Artists closed. The band's album The Foundation was released under Atlantic Records' newly re-established country division in association with the Home Grown/Bigger Picture label on November 18 of that year. "Chicken Fried" reached No. 1 on the country charts that same month, making them the first country band to reach No. 1 with a debut single since Heartland did so in 2006 with "I Loved Her First".

In July 2012, Zac Brown Band debuted their new CD, Uncaged, which was well received. Billboard considered the album to be the best country album of 2012 as of its release.

On January 7, 2013, Zac Brown Band performed the National Anthem at the 2013 BCS National Championship Game between the Alabama Crimson Tide and the Notre Dame Fighting Irish at Sun Life Stadium in Miami. Just two weeks later on January 20, 2013, the band performed the National Anthem during the NFC Championship Game between the Seattle Seahawks and the San Francisco 49ers at the CenturyLink Field in Seattle.

On January 1, 2014, Zac Brown Band performed the National Anthem during the NHL's Winter Classic between the Detroit Red Wings & Toronto Maple Leafs at Michigan Stadium in Ann Arbor, Michigan, home of the Michigan Wolverines football team.

The Zac Brown Band announced on January 12, 2015, that it had finalized a four-way strategic partnership involving the Southern Ground Artists record label, Big Machine Label Group, Republic Records, and John Varvatos Records for the release of its fourth studio album. The terms of the deal state that the Zac Brown Band will work with Big Machine Label Group for marketing and distribution, while Southern Ground Artists will work on radio promotion, Republic will provide support in the area of non-country radio formats and international promotion, and Varvatos will oversee branding and styling. Brown stated in a press release:

Southern Ground Artists together with John Varvatos Records, Big Machine Label Group, and Republic Records is the dream team for Zac Brown Band's evolution ... We're excited to reach new music fans worldwide.

Inclusion of Clay Cook
In January 2009, two months after "Chicken Fried" went to No. 1, Atlanta native Clay Cook joined the Zac Brown Band as its multi-instrumentalist and high tenor vocalist. Cook had previously collaborated with John Mayer and Shawn Mullins, and was also a member of the Marshall Tucker Band for two years prior to joining the Zac Brown Band.

Cook explains how he first met Brown:

Brown himself admitted his strong desire to add Cook to the lineup, for he believed Cook's musicianship would enhance the Zac Brown Band's overall musical style:

With the new Zac Brown Band lineup completed, the band released its second single, "Whatever It Is", which went to No. 2. In October 2009, a third single, "Toes", became the band's second Number One. The album's fourth single, and third No. 1, was "Highway 20 Ride". "Free" was the album's fifth single and on the week of August 21, 2010, it also peaked at Number One.

Uncaged and The Grohl Sessions, Vol. 1
On April 25, 2012, it was announced via the Zac Brown Band's website that percussionist Daniel de los Reyes had joined the band on a permanent basis. De los Reyes had previously performed with the band as a touring musician and participated in the recording of their album Uncaged. De los Reyes has also performed with artists and groups such as Earth, Wind and Fire, Jennifer Lopez and Sting. "Goodbye in Her Eyes" reached Number One on the Country Airplay chart in 2013. The album's third single, "Jump Right In", was released to country radio on February 25, 2013. It peaked at number 2 on the Country Airplay chart in August 2013. The album's fourth single, "Sweet Annie", was released to country radio in August 2013, and rose to number 1 in January 2014. The music video for this track features footage of band member Coy Bowles’ actual wedding. In December 2013, the band released a digital four-song EP titled The Grohl Sessions, Vol. 1, produced by Dave Grohl of Foo Fighters. It was later given a physical release featuring a 45-minute DVD on the album's creation. "All Alright" was released as a single from the EP, charting at number 17 on Country Airplay.

In April 2014, the band announced its summer tour schedule, which included Kacey Musgraves as an opening act, and the addition of Matt Mangano as an eighth member. Mangano previously performed live with Zac Brown Band when they performed "Blackbird" on the "Pass The Jar" live album. Mangano assumed the role of bass guitarist, while original bassist John Driskell Hopkins began adding other instruments including banjo and ukulele.

Jekyll + Hyde
The band signed to Big Machine Records in 2015 and released its sixteenth single, "Homegrown", in January. The song, co-produced by Jay Joyce, was the lead single to an album, titled Jekyll + Hyde, which was released on April 28, 2015. Despite being a country album, Jekyll + Hyde features prominent styles from other genres in several of its tracks including rock (Heavy Is the Head), EDM (Beautiful Drug ), celtic (Remedy), reggae (Castaway) and traditional pop/jazz (Mango Tree).

On Saturday, March 7, 2015, the band made their Saturday Night Live debut, performing "Homegrown" and "Heavy is the Head".

The band contributed vocals on the Avicii song "Broken Arrows", released in September 2015.

Jekyll + Hyde is the first album that ZBB recorded when they weren't on the road.

Welcome Home
On January 30, 2017, the band previewed cover art for a new album titled Welcome Home produced by Dave Cobb, was released on May 12, 2017. The first single from the album, "My Old Man", was released on February 3, 2017. Their latest song "Roots" was released on May 3, 2017. The band performed the song on The Tonight Show Starring Jimmy Fallon on March 29, 2017.
In September 2018, it was announced that Zac Brown Band would make their second appearance of CMT Crossroads along with Shawn Mendes, which was televised on October 24, 2018.

The Owl
The band released their sixth album The Owl on September 20, 2019. The album includes collaborations with Skrillex, Max Martin, Ryan Tedder, Benny Blanco, Andrew Watt, Jason "Poo Bear" Boyd, and others. A digital single from the album, "Leaving Love Behind" was released on July 26, 2019. Brown describes some songs on the album as "personal" and "pretty heavy." Concurrently, Brown released a solo album called Controversy, accompanied by a new single called "Swayze".

The Comeback 
On October 15, 2021, the band released their 7th album The Comeback. The first single from the album, "Same Boat", was released on June 11, 2021, by Homegrown Music and Waner Music Nashville. The song became the band's first number one single on the Country Airplay chart since 2016's "Beautiful Drug" and their fourteenth overall. The album's second single "Out in the Middle" was released in January 2022 and reached number thirteen. A deluxe edition of the album was released in September 2022 and features several tracks reimagined as duets featuring Blake Shelton, Ingrid Andress and Jamey Johnson, Cody Johnson and Jimmy Buffett. On November 3, 2022, it was announced that Caroline Jones had joined the group as an official member after having opened for and toured with the band since 2017 becoming the band's first female member.

Awards
Since 2009, the Zac Brown Band has earned 55 award nominations from the Grammys, Academy of Country Music, American Music Awards, Country Music Association and Country Music Television, and has won 8.

They have received four nominations for the 2009 CMA Awards: New Artist of the Year, Song of the Year, Single of the Year, and Music Video of the Year for their No. 1 single, "Chicken Fried". That same year, they received three Grammy nominations for Best Country Album, Best Country Performance By a Duo or Group With Vocals and Best New Artist. On January 31, 2010, the band won the Grammy award for Best New Artist.

The Zac Brown Band was also nominated in 2009 for three ACM awards, "Album of the Year", "Vocal Group of the Year", and was one of eight contenders for "Entertainer of the Year".

The Zac Brown Band led the nominees for the 46th annual Academy of Country Music Awards 2011, with a total of nine nominations including: Vocal Group of the Year, Album of the Year, Single Record of the Year, Song of the Year, Vocal Event of the Year.

Grammy Awards
{| class="wikitable"
|-
! Year
! Nominee/work
! Category
! Result
! class="unsortable"| 
|-
|rowspan="3"|2010
|Zac Brown Band
|Best New Artist
|
|
|-
| The Foundation
| Best Country Album
|
|
|-
| "Chicken Fried"
|rowspan="2"|Best Country Performance by a Duo or Group with Vocals
|
|
|-
|rowspan="4"|2011
| rowspan="2"|"Free"
|
|
|-
|Best Country Song
|
|
|-
| "As She's Walking Away" (featuring Alan Jackson)
|Best Country Collaboration with Vocals
|
|
|-
| You Get What You Give
|rowspan="2"| Best Country Album
|
|
|-
|2013
| Uncaged
|
|
|-
|2018
|"My Old Man"
|Best Country Duo/Group Performance
|
|

Collaborations and appearances
Along with recent commercial success, the band has made appearances at The Hangout Music Festival, Hullabalou Music Festival and the Bonnaroo Music Festival in 2006, 2009, and 2010 along with an opening slot for the Dave Matthews Band during their 2010 Summer Tour. Also, after several years as perennial favorites on the annual The Rock Boat theme-cruise, the Zac Brown Band has been elevated to hosting their own theme-cruise, Sailing Southern Ground, in September 2010. In Fall of 2009, the band began offering fan-club members the ability to purchase tickets to VIP Eat & Greet experiences before the majority of their tour appearances. These events afford fans the opportunity to share a meal with band-members before the show, and have become an integral part of the overall Zac Brown Band live experience.

In 2011, the Zac Brown Band and Blackberry Smoke held a concert tour at venues and amphitheaters including Hollywood Bowl in Los Angeles, CA.

On April 28, 2013, the Zac Brown Band headlined the 2013 Stagecoach Festival in Indio, California.

Zac Brown Band completed a three-night, headlining stint at Red Rocks Amphitheatre on Wednesday, May 8, 2013, Thursday, May 9, 2013, and Friday, May 10, 2013. All three performances were sold out.

On September 6, 2013, Zac Brown sat in with The String Cheese Incident and performed as the Zac Brown Incident during the inaugural Lockin' Festival in Arrington, VA.

On November 6, 2013, Zac Brown Band performed at the 2013 CMA awards with Dave Grohl on drums, debuting their new song "Day for the Dead". On November 24, while being interviewed at the American Music Awards, Grohl revealed that he recently produced the band's new EP.

On January 21, 2014, Zac Brown Band released a live version of their 2010 #1 hit "Free" (transitioning into the Van Morrison classic "Into the Mystic"). The track features Clare Bowen and precedes their January 22 appearance on the ABC TV show Nashville. The song(s) were recorded at the 2013 Southern Ground Music & Food Festival in Nashville.

In 2016, Zac Brown formed a side-project, Sir Rosevelt, that released several singles and announced an album that was released December 15, 2017.

Zac Brown Band re-recorded the song "From Now On" from The Greatest Showman, as part of a compilation album, The Greatest Showman: Reimagined. The album was released on November 16, 2018.

Brown performed "Colder Weather" at the 2019 Musicians Hall of Fame and Museum Concert and Induction Ceremony.

Revenue
In 2015, Forbes estimated that Zac Brown Band's annual income was $32 million.

Philanthropy
The band has also supported Little Kids Rock, a national nonprofit that works to restore and revitalize music education programs in disadvantaged U.S. public schools, by donating items for auction to raise money for the organization. On January 16, 2013, Zac Brown, Clay Cook, and David Ryan Harris played a benefit with John Mayer for the firefighters and the residents of Pine Creek in Park County, Montana, who fought a fire that swept through the area, and destroyed five homes.

Band members
Current members
 Zac Brown – lead vocals, guitar, banjo, bass guitar (2002–present)
 Jimmy De Martini – fiddle, guitar, mandolin, backing vocals (2004–present)
 John Driskell Hopkins – backing and occasional lead vocals (2005–present); bass guitar, double bass (2005–2014); guitar, baritone guitar, ukulele, banjo (2014–present)
 Coy Bowles – guitar, slide guitar, Hammond organ, piano (2007–present)
 Chris Fryar – drums, percussion (2008–present)
 Clay Cook – guitar, slide guitar, Hammond organ, piano, backing vocals (2009–present)
 Daniel de los Reyes – percussion (2012–present)
 Matt Mangano – bass guitar, backing vocals (2014–present)
 Caroline Jones – vocals, guitar, banjo, mandolin, dobro, piano, steel guitar, autoharp, harmonica (2022–present)

Past members
 Marcus Petruska – drums, percussion, backing vocals (2003–2008)
 Jacob Lawson – bass guitar (2003–2005)
 Tim Ussery – guitar, mandolin, bass guitar (2003–2005)
 Joel Williams – guitar (2005–2008)

Timeline

Discography

 The Foundation (2008)
 You Get What You Give (2010)
 Uncaged (2012)
 Jekyll + Hyde (2015)
 Welcome Home (2017)
 The Owl (2019)
 The Comeback (2021)

Tours
Headlining
Uncaged Tour (2012–13)
The Great American Road Trip Tour (2014)
Jekyll + Hyde Tour (2015)
Black Out The Sun Tour (2016)
Welcome Home Tour (2017)
Down the Rabbit Hole Live (2018–19)
The Owl Tour (2019)
The Comeback Tour (2021)
Out In The Middle Tour (2022)

Supporting
 Goin' Coastal Tour with Kenny Chesney (2011)

References

Other sources
 Zac Brown, Havighurst, Craig. Acoustic Guitar 20.10 (April 2010): 58-61. International Index to Music Periodicals Full Text
 Zac Brown Band and the art of the cover song at Jazz Aspen Labor Day fest

External links

 Official Site
 [ Zac Brown Band] at Billboard.com

 
Country music groups from Georgia (U.S. state)
American rock music groups
American reggae musical groups
Atlantic Records artists
Bigger Picture Music Group artists
Grammy Award winners
Musical groups from Atlanta
Musical groups established in 2000